Rizaabad may refer to:
 Rizaabad, Fars
 Rizaabad, Markazi
 Rizaabad, North Khorasan
 Rizaabad, Qazvin

See also
Raziabad (disambiguation)
Rezaabad (disambiguation)